Pool Quay railway station was a station in Pool Quay, Powys, Wales. The station was opened on 1 May 1860 and closed on 18 January 1965.

References

Disused railway stations in Powys
Railway stations in Great Britain opened in 1860
Railway stations in Great Britain closed in 1965
Former Cambrian Railway stations
Beeching closures in Wales